Captain Charles Bampfield Yule, R.N. (1806 – 1 November 1878 at Anderton, Cornwall, United Kingdom) was an explorer and author of the Admiralty Australia Directory.

The third son of Commander John Yule RN who served with Nelson at Trafalgar and a mother who was the daughter of Bampfield Carslake, Charles Bampfield Yule was the brother of the Reverend John Carslake Duncan Yule. While a Lieutenant, he commanded  as part of the surveying expedition led by Frances Blackwood from 1842 to 1845. Yule discovered and named Heron Island off Queensland, Australia on 11 January 1843. He continued on to survey the coast of New Guinea in 1846 and assisted Owen Stanley in his New Guinea expedition of 1848–1849. Although Yule claimed New Guinea for Great Britain, his claim was not recognised by the British government (although Great Britain was later to officially claim southeastern New Guinea in 1884). His survey work was incorporated into volumes of the Australia Directory from 1853 to 1868.

Yule Island in Papua-New Guinea is most likely named after Yule, although he did not claim credit for its discovery.

Ranks
11 May 1830 – Entered Royal Navy
2 April 1842 – Lieutenant
18 September 1851 – Commander
1 October 1866 Captain

Commands
2 April 1830 – HMS Bramble
During his command, Bramble was attached to  during survey duties on the East Indies Station, mainly around the coast of Eastern Australia and New Guinea. Some were published in the form of sailing directions, such as that Endeavour Strait in 1845. before being compiled into The Australia Directory.

Publications
The Australia Directory

See also
 
 European and American voyages of scientific exploration

References

External links
 Ian Nicholson. Log of Logs vol. 1 page 71
William Loney RN
 
 
 

1806 births
1878 deaths
Royal Navy officers
19th-century Royal Navy personnel
Explorers of Papua New Guinea
Explorers of Queensland